Realive (Spanish: Proyecto Lázaro) is a 2016 Belgian-Spanish-French English-language science fiction drama film written and directed by Mateo Gil.

Plot 
A man with a terminal illness has his body frozen in cryostasis and becomes the first man to be resuscitated from cryonics seventy years later in the year 2084.
His on-and-off-again girlfriend is by his side as he commits suicide in order to be cryopreserved. Being an accomplished artist with a design firm under his wing, he cannot stand the randomness of his throat cancer and decides to "go" under his own volition and control. After his "resurrection" under project "Lazarus", by a company with its own agenda, he starts to question mortality and matters of soul, as well as life as a transition of matter and energy. After realizing that he only valued his own life under the threat of his imminent death, unable to cope with his new life, he decides to commit suicide. Alas, the film ends with the realization that is something he's not allowed to do.

Cast 
 Tom Hughes as Marc Jarvis
 Charlotte Le Bon as Elizabeth
 Oona Chaplin as Naomi
 Barry Ward as Dr. West
 Julio Perillán as Dr. Serra
 Rafael Cebrián as Jeffrey
 Bruno Sevilla as Charles
 Daniel Horvath as Surgeon
 Alex Hafner as The Elderly Hornball
 Godeliv Van den Brandt as Sigourney
 Melina Matthews as Technician
 Nikol Kollars as Dr. Gethers
 Angelo Olivier as Marc's Father
 Yone Sosa as Lizard boy
 Maarten Swaan as Alex
 Alexandra Szucs as Sandy
 Johanna Wallmeier as Rebecca
 Josh Gorroño Chapman as Boy 1

Production 
Filming took place in Tenerife, Canary Islands (Spain).

Reception 
Film critic Dennis Harvey of Variety.com wrote that "Gil demonstrates a graceful assurance orchestrating Realives design and technical elements" but felt that the film was ultimately "emotionally antiseptic".

References

External links 
 

2016 films
Spanish science fiction drama films
Belgian science fiction drama films
French science fiction drama films
English-language Spanish films
English-language Belgian films
English-language French films
2010s science fiction drama films
Films scored by Lucas Vidal
Films set in 2024
Films set in 2084
Films set in Spain
Cryonics in fiction
2016 drama films
2010s English-language films
2010s French films